The National Assembly Budget Office (NABO) supports the Korean National Assembly by analyzing and evaluating issues related to the national budget, fund and fiscal operations.

History
2003. 
 Establishment of the National Assembly Budget Office
2007. 
 Initiation of government performance management evaluation program
2010. 
 Acquisition of access to national tax statistics
2012. 
 Publication of "Long-term Fiscal Projection 2012–2060"
2015. 
 Initiation of Special Taxation Evaluation Program
 Initiation of the exclusive mandate to produce cost estimates of bills
2017. 
 Inauguration of the Seventh (current) Chief, Dr. Chunsoon Kim
 Revision of Organization Rule (4 Department, 2 Deputy Directors General, 3 Directors, 17 Divisions and total of 138 staff)

Mission
The mission on the NABO is To support legislative activities through analysis and evaluation of national finances and policies.

Leadership
The Speaker of the National Assembly appoints the Chief with the consent of the Steering Committee after examining recommendations from the NABO Chief Recommendation Commission. There is no specified term of service for the Chief, Chunsoon Kim is the current Chief of the National Assembly Budget Office.

Divisions

The NABO is divided into the Planning and Management Department, the Budget Analysis Department, the Estimates and Tax Analysis Department, and the Economic Analysis Department.

Planning and Management Department
 General Affairs Division
 Policy Coordination Division
 Planning & Budget Division

Budget Analysis Department
 Program Evaluation Counsel
Budget Analysis Coordination Division
 Industrial Budget Analysis Division
 Social Budget Analysis Division
 Administrative Budget Analysis Division
 Economic Industrial Program Evaluation Division
 Social Administrative Program Evaluation Division
 Public Institution Evaluation Division

 Estimates and Tax Analysis Department
 Tax Analysis Counsel
Estimates and Tax Coordination Division
 Economic Cost Estimates Division
 Social Cost Estimates Division
 Administrative Cost Estimates Division
 Income & Corporate Tax Analysis Division
 Property & Consumption Tax Analysis Division

Economic Analysis Department
 The Economic Analysis Coordination Division
 Macro-Economic Analysis Division
 Industry & Employment Analysis Division
 Population & Strategy Analysis Division

See also 
Congressional Budget Office (United States)
Office for Budget Responsibility (United Kingdom)
Parliamentary Budget Officer (Canada)
Parliamentary Budget Office (Australia)

References

External links 
NABO Website
NABO Facebook

Government agencies of South Korea
Economic research institutes